Amphelarctia is a monotypic moth genus in the family Erebidae described by Allan Watson in 1975. Its single species, Amphelarctia priscilla, was first described by William Schaus in 1911. It is found in French Guiana, Venezuela, Ecuador, Peru, Suriname and Costa Rica.

References

External links
Original description of the genus: Bulletin of the British Museum (Natural History) Entomology Supplement.

Phaegopterina
Monotypic moth genera
Moths described in 1911
Moths of Central America
Moths of South America